Count Magnus is a British supernatural  television film broadcast on BBC Two on 23 December 2022 as part of the BBC's Christmas festive programmes. The thirty-minute film is one of the BBC’s A Ghost Story for Christmas series and was written and directed by Mark Gatiss, based on the 1904 short story of the same name by M. R. James.

Synopsis
In 1863 a British travelogue writer, Mr Wraxhall, travels to Sweden collecting information for a scholarly guidebook to Scandinavia. He visits the manor-house of Råbäck in Vestergothland, which had been built by one Count Magnus De la Gardie in the early 17th century. He becomes fascinated by the story of the long-dead nobleman Count Magnus, who, it is said, was a "merciless" character known locally for being a harsh landowner, who branded his tenants if they were late with their rent and who burnt down their houses if they were built too near his lands - with them in them.

Nielsen, the village innkeeper, has tales to tell about Count Magnus, including that of his journey on a "Black Pilgrimage" to the Holy Land "on most unholy business", bringing something – or someone – back with him.

Cast
Jason Watkins as Mr Wraxhall
MyAnna Buring as Froken de la Gardie 
Krister Henriksson as the Narrator
Max Bremer as Nielsen
Allan Corduner as the Deacon
Jamal Ajala as Gustav

Adaptation
The story was not included in the original 1970s run of A Ghost Story for Christmas for budgetary reasons. Director  Lawrence Gordon Clark wanted to make the story in 1978, later acknowledging; "I wanted to make Count Magnus by M.R. James but they wouldn’t put up the money for it, which I felt was pretty shortsighted considering the success we’d had with the series."

In 2019 Mark Gatiss stated, "The one everyone has always wanted to do is Count Magnus, which eluded the great Lawrence Gordon Clark." Gatiss finally got to make his cut-back version in 2022. Of Gatiss’s adaptation, Lucy Mangan of The Guardian giving the production 2 stars out of 5, wrote, "The plot is slight, it’s far from visually engaging and it manages one paltry jump scare. I’ve had worse frights from a Misty comic strip.", while Orlando Bird of The Daily Telegraph gave it 3 stars, writing, "Mark Gatiss's MR James ghost stories have become a pleasurable Christmas TV staple, even if this offering tickled rather than thrilled."

In an interview in the Radio Times published in December 2022, Gatiss revealed that he had introduced a plot twist in his version. He said that the story's narrator is actually Count Magnus, his life unnaturally extended by his deal with the “Prince of the Air” which allows him to narrate his story from within his padlocked tomb. Gatiss said:

"This one needed a narrator, I think, just because there were lots of nice little passages [in the original story]... In the story, it’s an Englishman. But soon as I thought it could be a Swedish voice, I thought, 'Well, whose voice could that be?' and then the idea came to me of him [Count Magnus] lying in the tomb, narrating it for his own purposes! So yeah, that’s what that came from."

Locations

Filming locations included the Hall Barn estate in Beaconsfield, South Bucks. The temple beside the house stood in for the mausoleum of Count Magnus. No filming took place in Sweden owing to budgetary restraints.

Trivia
The name of the principal character is spelt Wraxall in the original story by M.R.James.

References

External sources

Adaptations of works by M. R. James
Television films based on short fiction
2022 television films
2022 films
A Ghost Story for Christmas